Adrian Griffith (born 11 November 1984) is a Bahamian sprinter who specializes in the 100 metres.

He competed at the 2009 World Championships without reaching the final. In the 4×100 metres relay he won silver medals at the 2006 Central American and Caribbean Games and the 2008 Central American and Caribbean Championships.

His personal best time is 10.14 seconds, achieved in Clermont Florida April 2014. This makes him the second fastest Bahamian of all time behind Derrick Atkins, and fastest Bahamian-born sprinter, at the time. That mark has since been broken by Shavez Hart

He teamed up with Jamial Rolle, Shavez Hart and Trevorvano Mackey to break the Bahamian 4x100 national record in Morelia, Mexico.

University
Griffith graduated with his Bachelor of Science degree in Computer Science as a magna cum laude honoree at Dickinson State University in Dickinson, North Dakota. He was a part of two-time National Association of Intercollegiate Athletics (NAIA) National Championship team while attending Dickinson State University. He also was a six-time Conference Championship team (Indoor and Outdoor Conference meet), eight-time NAIA All-American, 9-time All DAC-10 Conference, four-time DAC-10 Conference Champion and was named 2006 Most Outstanding Athlete in DAC 10 Conference meet.  He was also the former school record holder in both the 100 meters and long jump.

Personal bests

Outdoor
100 m: 10.11 s (wind:  m/s) –  Montverde, Florida, 11 June 2016
200 m: 20.54 s (wind: +1.1 m/s) –  Clermont, Florida, 10 May 2014
Long jump: 7.59 m (wind: +1.7 m/s) –  Nassau, Bahamas, 17 June 2006

Indoor
60 m: 6.63 s –  Newport News, Virginia, 8 February 2014
Long jump: 7.63 m –  Johnson City, Tennessee, 10 March 2006

International competitions

References

External links
 

1984 births
Living people
Athletes (track and field) at the 2007 Pan American Games
Athletes (track and field) at the 2011 Pan American Games
Pan American Games competitors for the Bahamas
Bahamian male sprinters
Athletes (track and field) at the 2010 Commonwealth Games
Athletes (track and field) at the 2014 Commonwealth Games
Commonwealth Games competitors for the Bahamas
People from New Providence
Athletes (track and field) at the 2016 Summer Olympics
Olympic athletes of the Bahamas
Central American and Caribbean Games silver medalists for the Bahamas
Competitors at the 2006 Central American and Caribbean Games
Central American and Caribbean Games medalists in athletics